Teresio Vachet (born 4 February 1947 in Bardonecchia) is a retired Italian alpine skier who competed in the 1968 Winter Olympics.
He is now a coach in Italy.

External links
 sports-reference.com
 

1947 births
Living people
Italian male alpine skiers
Olympic alpine skiers of Italy
Alpine skiers at the 1968 Winter Olympics
People from Bardonecchia
Sportspeople from the Metropolitan City of Turin